All About My Romance is a 2013 South Korean television series starring Shin Ha-kyun, Lee Min-jung, Park Hee-soon and Han Chae-ah. It aired on SBS from April 4 to May 29, 2013, on Wednesdays and Thursdays at 21:55 (KST) for 16 episodes.

The political-romantic comedy series was written by Kwon Ki-young and directed by Son Jung-hyun, who previously worked together on Protect the Boss (2011).

Cast

Main
Shin Ha-kyun as Kim Soo-young
A legislator for the conservative New Korea Party. He is a newly-elected member of the national assembly. Prior to that, he worked as a judge. But when the higher-ups began pressuring him for judicial favors, he decided to enter politics.

Lee Min-jung as Noh Min-young
An assemblywoman for the Progressive Labor Party. She joined the world of politics after her older sister, a former presidential candidate, died.

Park Hee-soon as Song Joon-ha
A prosecutor who becomes Min-young's aide. His brother is married to Min-young's sister.

Han Chae-ah as Ahn Hee-sun
A news reporter from SeAh Daily Report. She went to the same law school as Soo-young and Joon-ha.

Supporting

Great Korea Party
Jin Tae-hyun as Kim Sang-soo
Chun Ho-jin as Go Dae-ryong
Gong Hyung-jin as Moon Bong-shik
Jang Gwang as Maeng Joo-ho
Son Deok-ki as Park Bu-san

Green and Justice Party
Min Ji-ah as Jung Yoon-hee
Kim Jung-nan as Go Dong-sook
Heo Jung-min as Seo Yoon-ki

Extended
Jeon Min-seo as Song Bo-ri
Kim Hye-ok as Na Young-sook
Shin Young-jin as Noh Min-hwa

Cameo appearances
Shin So-yul as a female student
Park Eun-kyung as a radio DJ
Ahn Nae-sang as Song Gyo-soo
 Park Young-ji as Chairman of SeAh Daily Report
 Pyeon Sang-wook as an SBS reporter

References

External links
  
 
 

2013 South Korean television series debuts
2013 South Korean television series endings
Seoul Broadcasting System television dramas
Korean-language television shows
South Korean romantic comedy television series
South Korean political television series
Television series by Studio S